Area codes 876 and 658 are telephone area codes in the North American Numbering Plan (NANP) for Jamaica. Area code 876 was created on 1 May 1997 by a split of the original Caribbean numbering plan area (NPA) 809.
In 2018, the numbering plan area received a second area code, 658, in formation of an overlay to relieve central office code exhaustion. The international calling code (county code) for reaching telephone numbers in the country is 1. From other member countries of the North American Numbering Plan, the dialing pattern is 1-658/876 NXX-XXXX, when 1 is the NANP long-distance trunk prefix.

History
After installation of area code 876, a permissive dialing period began 1 May 1997 and ended 1 May 1998.
Area code 876 serves the country’s two mobile operators – Cable & Wireless/Liberty Global (marketed as FLOW Jamaica) and Digicel. Also served by area code 876 is the country's main landline provider, FLOW, as well as other smaller landline players like Digicel.

Local calls within Jamaica were dialed as seven digits until 29 October 2018. On 15 September 2016, the Office of Utilities Regulation had approved an area code overlay in relief of central office code exhaustion in the country, with an in-service date of 30 November 2018, thereby doubling the number of central office codes, and number of telephone numbers for the country.

Jamaica expanded to 10-digit dialling, for local telephone calls on 30 October 2018. This is as a result of Jamaica's new area code assignment of 658.

Relief
On 15 September 2016, the Office of Utility Regulation in Jamaica announced that an all-services overlay, by area code 658, would be implemented in 2018 to provide relief as the 876 code is nearing exhaustion. Permissive 10-digit dialing was in effect from 31 May, becoming mandatory on 30 October 2018, and the new 658 code was activated on 30 November 2018.

Fraud
The 876 area code has been linked to a form of telephone fraud known as the "one ring scam". The person perpetuating the scam calls the victim via a robodialer or similar means, sometimes at odd hours of the night, then hangs up when the phone is answered with the hope that they will be curious enough to call the number back. When the victim does this, an automatic $19.95 international call fee is charged to their account, as well as $9/min thereafter. Similar scams have been linked to Grenada (area code 473), Antigua (268), the Dominican Republic (809, 829, and 849), and the British Virgin Islands (284).

The telephone fraud in Jamaica is a primary topic of the episode "Jamaican Lottery Scam" of the television series American Greed.

See also
 List of NANP area codes
 Area codes in the Caribbean

References

External links
 Quick on lotto scam bill, slow on crime cure - Jamaica Gleaner
 North American Numbering Plan Administrator
 List of exchanges from AreaCodeDownload.com, 876 Area Code

Communications in Jamaica
876